Solar cell fabric is a fabric with embedded photovoltaic (PV) cells which generate electricity when exposed to light.

Traditional silicon based solar cells are expensive to manufacture, rigid and fragile. Although less efficient, thin-film cells and organic polymer based cells can be produced quickly and cheaply. They are also flexible and can be stitched onto fabric.

According to an article from New Scientist   researchers have built a PV cell in the layers around a fiber, creating a tiny cylindrical cell. No longer limited to rooftops and poles, solar collection could work silently and unobtrusively from everyday objects.

Examples of recent research

Flexible solar cells can be used in humanitarian aid. A makeshift shelter developed by PowerFilm, Inc. called the PowerShade can generate one kilowatt of power. This could help a power emergency equipment at short notice in remote places.

Konarka Technologies produce a thin film polymer based PV cell, as a flexible film stitched onto a fabric. The ability to make these cells even smaller is dependent on further research into nanocrystal PV cells. In theory nanotechnology could provide a way to expand the range of photons a cell could collect, increasing its efficiency while becoming smaller. Konarka, in partner with other institutions, is working on this.

ShadePlex is currently developing a product that integrates thin film photovoltaic modules with architectural fabrics.  They will feature a high power output (200 W, 500 W, and 1000 W), and can feed either a battery system or be tied to the grid.  Integrating thin film photovoltaics with fabric structures will enable a whole class of buildings to easily integrate renewable energy solutions.

References

Solar cells
Technical fabrics
Energy conversion